Midview High School is a public high school located in Eaton Township, just north of Grafton, Ohio, United States.

History
Midview High School was originally built in 1956 as a Junior High School, until the needs of the district demanded more room for students in grades 9-12. The building was then designated as the High School in 1956, and has remained so ever since.

Midview High School's current core curriculum includes classes in Language Arts, International Studies (French and Spanish), Math, Science, Business, Social Sciences, Health & Physical Education, Art, Music (Instrumental and Vocal), and Vocational & Occupational Studies (Industrial, Technology, and Home Economics). The high school is also certified in L.D. and D.D. programs.

Athletics
The school colors are blue and silver.  The athletic teams are known as the Middies. 
Midview is currently a member of the Southwestern Conference, which the school moved to in 2015. Midview was a previous member of the now defunct West Shore Conference

Fall
Cheerleading (Varsity, JV, and Freshmen; Competition & Game Day Competition)
Cross Country (Boys & Girls Varsity)
Football (Varsity, JV, and Freshmen)
Soccer (Boys & Girls Varsity and JV)
Volleyball (Varsity, JV, and Freshmen)
Girls Tennis (Varsity and JV)
Winter
Basketball (Boys & Girls, Varsity, JV, and Freshmen)
Ice Hockey (Varsity only)
Wrestling (Varsity and JV)
Skippers
Bowling (Boys & Girls)
Gymnastics
Spring
Track and Field (Varsity only)
Softball (Varsity and JV)
Baseball (Varsity, JV, and Freshmen)
Boys Tennis (Varsity)

Organizations 
Clubs & Activities
Academic Quiz Team
Air Force JROTC
Art Club
Best Buddies
Bowling
Broadcasting
Car Club
Class Crew
Drama Club & International Thespian Society
Future Business Leaders of America (FBLA)
Hall of Honor Student Selection Committee
Hats for Humanity
International Club – World Languages
Key Club
Link Crew
LOVE Club
Midview Fellowship of Christian Athletes (FCA)
Midview Marching Blue
National Honor Society
Newspaper
Photography
Quiz Bowl Club
Student Council
Yearbook

Music Groups
Band 1 & Band 2
Jazz Band
SATB Chorale
MHS Chorus
Midview Express

Notable alumni
 Tom Batiuk, Comic strip creator of Funky Winkerbean
 Dustin Crum, professional football player in the National Football League (NFL)
 Ryan Feierabend, professional baseball pitcher in Major League Baseball (MLB)
 Dan Knechtges, Tony Award-nominated choreographer
 Eric Lauer, professional baseball pitcher in MLB
 Joe Staysniak, sports radio talk show host and professional football player in the NFL

References

External links
School Website

High schools in Lorain County, Ohio
Public high schools in Ohio